The 2013 Rolex 24 at Daytona was a long-distance motor race for sports cars conforming to the regulations of the Grand-Am Road Racing series. The 51st edition was raced between January 26 and 27. Michael Shank Racing is the defending champion in DP class and Magnus Racing in GT class. It was also the debut of the GX class for "purpose built, series produced and modified replicas of series produced automobiles that are not eligible for the GT class." It was the last time the 24 Hours of Daytona was part of the Rolex Sports Car Series.

The "Roar Before the Rolex 24"
Canadian driver Michael Valiante made the fastest lap of the "Roar" in the final session (1:42.058). Valiante raced in the #6 Ford/Riley of Michael Shank Racing. Dane Cameron in the Sahlen's #42 BMW/Riley set the second time in 1:42.101. In the GT the #73 Porsche GT3 was the fastest and clocked a 1:48.569. Shane Lewis was the fastest in the new GX category. 1:56.167 was the time for Lewis in a Porsche Cayman.

Qualifying
The qualifying was performed this Thursday, 24. DP session started at 15:40 EST and finished at 15:55 ET. GT and GX qualified between 16:10 ET and 16:25 ET.

Scott Pruett took the pole position in the #01 Chip Ganassi Racing with Felix Sabates Riley-BMW. Nick Tandy in the GT performed the fastest lap in a Porsche GT3. Shane Lewis made the first pole in the GX category with a Porsche Cayman.

Pole positions in each class are denoted in bold.

The race

The race started at 3:30 (EST) on Saturday, January 26, 2013 and ended at 3:30 (EST) on Sunday, January 27, 2013. The first two hours were dominated by #01 Chip Ganassi, driven by Scott Pruett.

This race had the first mother/son pairing in the race's history as Utah native Madison Snow teamed with his mother, Melanie.

Race results
Class winners in bold.

References

24 Hours of Daytona
Daytona
Daytona 24
Daytona 24